Fiona Hughes is a senior lecturer in philosophy and Director of Education for Philosophy at the University of Essex.

In January 2017, Hughes was on the expert panel for BBC Radio 4's In Our Time on Nietzsche's Genealogy of Morality.

Selected publications

References 

Academics of the University of Essex
British women academics
British women philosophers
21st-century British philosophers
Living people
Year of birth missing (living people)